The 2015 season is the 134th year in the history of Warwickshire County Cricket Club and their 121st as a first-class county. In 2015, Warwickshire are competing in the first division of the County Championship, Group B of the Royal London One-Day Cup and the North Division of the NatWest t20 Blast. In the NatWest t20 Blast, the club are competing under the name "Birmingham Bears" for the second time.

On 1 July a new county record was set for a sixth wicket partnership when Laurie Evans and Tim Ambrose added 327 against Sussex in the County Championship at Birmingham.

Squad

County Championship

Division One Table

Results

Royal London-One Day Cup

Group B Table

Fixtures

NatWest t20 Blast

North Division Table

Results

References

2015 in English cricket
2015